Elk Park School is a historic school building located at Elk Park, Avery County, North Carolina. It was built between 1935 and 1938 by the Works Progress Administration.  It is a one-story, E-shaped Rustic Revival-style stone building.  It measures 16 bays wide and has a large gymnasium ell.  A one-story, concrete block cafeteria addition was built in 1951.  
Scenes from the 1974 movie "Where The Lilies Bloom" were filmed in Elk Park School, and children from the elementary school appeared as extras in those scenes. 
It remained in use as a school until the end of the 20th century, then converted in 2004 to apartments.

It was listed on the National Register of Historic Places in 2005.

References

Works Progress Administration in North Carolina
School buildings on the National Register of Historic Places in North Carolina
School buildings completed in 1938
Schools in Avery County, North Carolina
National Register of Historic Places in Avery County, North Carolina